A constitutional referendum was held in Algeria on 8 September 1963. The new constitution had been drawn up by the Constituent Assembly elected in 1962, and was approved by 98% of voters, with a turnout of 82.7%.

Results

References

1963 referendums
1963 in Algeria
Constitutional referendums in Algeria